Pine Mountain Lake (PML) is a private gated community and a census-designated place (CDP) in Tuolumne County, California. The 2010 United States census reported Pine Mountain Lake's population was 2,796.

The ZIP Code is 95321. The community is inside area code 209.

The "Gateway to Yosemite", PML is an all-seasons vacation and retirement community. The community also hosts an 18-hole championship golf course, golf shop, lake lodge, tennis, hiking, horseback riding, swimming, fishing, an airport, and close proximity to local shopping, medical, and government services. It gets a light dusting of snow in the winter, and has warm summer days, a green spring, and colorful fall.

About

The community of Big Oak Flat was founded by James D. Savage, who began mining the area about 1851. In "Discovery of the Yosemite and the Indian War of 1851 which led to that event" by Lafayette Bunnell, Savage is credited as the leader of the first group of non-Native Americans of European ancestry into Yosemite Valley, on March 27, 1851.  Others of European ancestry may have seen the valley as early as 1833. From approximately 1916 to 1924, Big Oak Flat served as a staging area and housing location for workers constructing the Hetch Hetchy Railroad which was required to build the O'Shaughnessy Dam on the Tuolumne River in the Hetch Hetchy Valley. Big Oak Flat is now registered as California Historical Landmark #406.

The lake is spring-fed and is also fed by Big Creek. It affords water skiing, sailing, swimming and fishing. It has two sandy swim beaches, a boat launch marina and a fisherman's park. Pine Mountain Lake Association stocks the lake with trout. The lake is surrounded by pines and manzanitas, and most homes cannot be seen from the lake, preserving its wilderness feeling.

The Pine Mountain Lake subdivision was developed by Boise Cascade in the late 1960s with about 3,600 homesites averaging about one third to one half of an acre each. PML offers an equestrian center, tennis, a PGA rated golf course with a full-time golf pro, a "country club," and full-time mobile security patrol. The lake is about  feet above mean sea level. The highest points in the community are about  AMSL. Temperatures range from the 20–30 °F in winter to  80–90 °F in the summer.

Groveland has Tenaya Elementary School (grades K–8) and Tioga High School (grades 9–12), part of the Big Oak Flat-Groveland Unified School District.

Geography
According to the United States Census Bureau, the CDP covers an area of 19.3 square miles (49.9 km2), 19.0 square miles (49.1 km2) of it land and 0.3 square miles (0.7 km2) of it (1.46%) water.

Demographics
The 2010 United States Census reported that Pine Mountain Lake had a population of 2,796. The racial makeup of Pine Mountain Lake was 2,596 (92.8%) White, 18 (0.6%) African American, 25 (0.9%) Native American, 24 (0.9%) Asian, 7 (0.3%) Pacific Islander, 21 (0.8%) from other races, and 105 (3.8%) from two or more races. Hispanic or Latino of any race were 183 persons (6.5%).

The Census reported that 2,796 people (100% of the population) lived in households, 0 (0%) lived in non-institutionalized group quarters, and 0 (0%) were institutionalized.

There were 1,346 households, out of which 200 (14.9%) had children under the age of 18 living in them, 776 (57.7%) were opposite-sex married couples living together, 84 (6.2%) had a female householder with no husband present, 44 (3.3%) had a male householder with no wife present.  There were 66 (4.9%) unmarried opposite-sex partnerships, and 7 (0.5%) same-sex married couples or partnerships. 369 households (27.4%) were made up of individuals, and 216 (16.0%) had someone living alone who was 65 years of age or older. The average household size was 2.08.  There were 904 families (67.2% of all households); the average family size was 2.45.

The population was spread out, with 372 people (13.3%) under the age of 18, 95 people (3.4%) aged 18 to 24, 340 people (12.2%) aged 25 to 44, 973 people (34.8%) aged 45 to 64, and 1,016 people (36.3%) who were 65 years of age or older.  The median age was 60.0 years. For every 100 females, there were 94.6 males.  For every 100 females age 18 and over, there were 95.8 males.

The homeowner vacancy rate was 5.2%; the rental vacancy rate was 20.7%.  2,239 people (80.1% of the population) lived in owner-occupied housing units and 557 people (19.9%) lived in rental housing units.

Pine Mountain Lake, as well as the greater Groveland area, sits within Census Block 06109004200, which includes large portions of both southern Tuolumne County, as well as northern portions of Mariposa County.

Government

Airport
The Pine Mountain Lake Airport is five miles (8 km) from the intersection of Ferretti Road and SR120.  The facility has an FAA identifier of E45 and features a roughly- runway.

See also
 Groveland-Big Oak Flat, California
 Buck Meadows, California

Sources
 Map: "Stanislaus National Forest, California," U.S. Forest Service, 1979.
 Map: "Groveland, California," U.S. Geological Survey, 1987.
 Airport Facility Directory: Southwest U.S., U.S. Department of Transportation, Federal Aviation Administration, unknown date.

References

External links
 Pine Mountain Lake Association home page
 Pine Mountain Lake Aviation Association
 Friends of the Lake
 US Census Bureau Block Data for Pine Mountain Lake CBD

Census-designated places in Tuolumne County, California
Populated places in the Sierra Nevada (United States)
Gated communities in California